Spillmann's tapaculo (Scytalopus spillmanni) is a species of bird in the family Formicariidae. It inhabits the Andes of Colombia and Ecuador.

Taxonomy and systematics

The Spillmann's tapaculo was previously considered a subspecies of brown-rumped tapaculo (Scytalopus latebircola) but was elevated to species rank due to differences in their vocalizations. It and chusquea tapaculo (S. parkeri) form a superspecies. The population in Colombia's eastern Andes might be different enoung to be a subspecies.

Description

Males weigh  and females . The male is blackish gray above with a dark brown rump. It is lighter gray below with tawny to cinnamon flanks and vent area. Some females are like the male, but most have the upperparts heavily washed with brown and an orange lower belly. The juvenile is brown above and dusky below, with barring above and below.

Distribution and habitat

Spillmann's tapaculo is found in all three Andean ranges of Colombia and south into 
Ecuador. In the west it extends to Cotopaxi Province and in the east into Morona-Santiago Province. It inhabits the undergrowth of humid montane forest and is especially partial to Chusquea bamboo.

Behavior

Feeding

Spillmann's tapaculo forages on the ground or near it, mostly for small insects.

Breeding

Little is known about the breeding phenology of Spillmann's tapaculo, but it probably breeds throughout the year.

Vocalization

The song of Spillmann's tapaculo is a 10 to 20 second trill whose volume and sometime pitch increase .

Status

The IUCN has assessed Spillmann's tapaculo as being of Least Concern. It has a very large range and appears to be common throughout it.

References

Spillmann's tapaculo
Birds of the Colombian Andes
Birds of the Ecuadorian Andes
Spillmann's tapaculo
Taxonomy articles created by Polbot